The 2018 Chinese FA Women's Cup was the 12th edition of the Chinese FA Women's Cup.

Group stage
The draw took place on 12 March 2018.

Group A

Group B

Group C

Group D

Play-offs

9th–12th place play-offs

9th place play-off

11th place play-off

13th–16th place play-offs

13th place play-off

15th place play-off

Quarter-finals

1st Leg

2nd Leg

Changchun Rural Commercial Bank won 6–1 on aggregate.

Beijing BG Phoenix won 5–1 on aggregate.

Dalian Quanjian won 5–1 on aggregate.

5th–8th place play-offs

1st Leg

2nd Leg

Henan Huishang won 1–0 on aggregate.

Shanghai won 6–2 on aggregate.

Semi-finals

1st Leg

2nd Leg

Jiangsu Suning won 5–1 on aggregate.

Dalian Quanjian won 3–1 on aggregate.

7th–8th place play-offs

1st Leg

2nd Leg

Wuhan Jianghan University won 3–0 on aggregate.

5th–6th place play-offs

1st Leg

2nd Leg

Shanghai won 6–2 on aggregate.

3rd–4th place play-offs

1st Leg

2nd Leg

Changchun Rural Commercial Bank won 4–3 on aggregate.

Finals

1st Leg

2nd Leg

Jiangsu Suning won 7–0 on aggregate.

Final ranking

Notes

References

2018 in Chinese football